The 1976 Washington Huskies football team represented the University of Washington in the 1976 NCAA Division I football season as a member of the Pacific-8 Conference (Pac-8). The Huskies were led by head coach Don James in his second year, and played their home games on campus at Husky Stadium in Seattle. They finished season with a record of five wins and six losses (5–6 overall, 3–4 in  This was Washington's last losing season for 28 years, until 2004.

The Huskies defeated rivals Oregon and Washington State for a third

Schedule

Roster

Season summary

Oregon State

NFL Draft selections
Three University of Washington Huskies were selected in the 1977 NFL Draft, which lasted twelve rounds with 335 selections.

References

External links
 Official game program: Washington vs. Washington State at Spokane – November 20, 1976

Washington
Washington Huskies football seasons
Washington Huskies football